Libertador General San Martín is a department located on the north eastern border of Chaco Province in Argentina.

The provincial subdivision has a population of about 54,500 inhabitants in an area of  7,800 km², and its capital city is General José de San Martín, which is located around 1,125 km from the Capital federal.

The department and its cabecera (capital) are named after José de San Martín, the General that led Argentina to victory over the Spanish Empire in the Argentine War of Independence.

Settlements
Ciervo Petiso
General José de San Martín
La Eduvigis
Laguna Limpia
Pampa Almirón
Pampa del Indio
Presidencia Roca

References

1934 establishments in Argentina
Departments of Chaco Province